Scrobipalpa zouhari is a moth in the family Gelechiidae. It was described by Povolný in 1984. It is found in China (Beijing).

References

Scrobipalpa
Moths described in 1984